The flag of Jamaica was adopted on 6 August 1962 (Jamaican Independence Day), the country having gained independence from the British-protected Federation of the West Indies. The flag consists of a gold saltire, which divides the flag into four sections: two of them green (top and bottom) and two black (hoist and fly). It is currently the only national flag that does not contain a shade of the colours red, white, or blue.

Design and symbolism
Prior to Jamaica's independence, the Jamaican government ran a flag design competition for Jamaica's new flag. Over 360 designs were submitted, and several of these original submissions are housed in the National Library of Jamaica. However, the competition failed to yield a winner, and a bipartisan committee of the Jamaican House of Representatives eventually came up with the modern design. It was originally designed with horizontal stripes, but this was considered too similar to the flag of Tanganyika (as it was in 1962), and so the saltire was substituted.

An earlier interpretation of the colours was, "hardships there are but the land is green and the sun shineth" as stated in the government Ministry Paper 28 - National Flag dated 22 May 1962. Gold recalls the shining sun, black reflects hardships, and green represents the land. It was changed in 1996 to black representing the strength and creativity of the people which has allowed them to overcome difficulties, gold for the wealth of the country and the golden sunshine, and green for the lush vegetation of the island, as well as hope. The change was made on the recommendation of the committee to Examine National Symbols and National Observances appointed by the then Prime Minister P. J. Patterson and chaired by Milton "Rex" Nettleford. The flag is blazoned: Per saltire vert and sable, a saltire Or.

Construction Sheet

Etiquette
Standard etiquette applies in Jamaica to use of the national flag, primarily ensuring it is always the primary flag flown and is in good condition. The National Flag Code (a set of rules that owners of a flag should follow) was instituted by the government.
 
Jamaica's state ensign is a Blue Ensign with the Jamaican national flag in the canton; it is normally only used by the Jamaican Government. Jamaica's naval ensign follows the British system and is a White Ensign with a Saint George's Cross and the Jamaican national flag in the canton, although due to the island's lack of a navy, it is normally only used by the Jamaican Coast Guard.

Historical flags

See also

 List of Jamaican flags
 Jamaica coalition (politics)

References

External links

 Jamaican Flag on Jamaican government site
 

 
Jamaica
National symbols of Jamaica
Jamaica